House of Hungama is Indian Telugu-language sitcom debuted on Star Maa on March 16, 2020, directed by Surendra. The series stars Suma Kanakala, Sruthi, RJ Hemanth, Raghava and Udaya Sree in lead roles. The show went off air abruptly due to COVID-19 when the shootings were stalled due to lockdown and restarted on Jan 01 2021 and ended on Jan 03 2021.

Cast
 Suma Kanakala as Designer Devi : Arundhati's daughter in law, Ramakanth and Sameeksha's sister, Ranga brother's wife.
 Sruthi as Acidity Arundathi : Devi's and Ramakanth and Sameeksha's mother in law, Ranga's mother. 
 Hemanth as Review Ranga
 Raghava as Engineer Ramakanth 
 Udaya Sree as Sameeksha

Development 
Suma Kanakala returns to fiction after fifteen years to star in this sitcom for Star Maa which is produced by Suma's production house.

Release 
The first episode of the show was premiered on Star Maa on March 16, 2020, at 9.30-10 pm time slot which was also available on Hotstar on the same day. The show last aired on 2 April 2020 due to lockdown and went off air.

The show started airing again on January 1, 2021, with new episodes and ended on January 3, 2021.

Promotion 
The first teaser was launched on February 20, 2020

References 

Indian television series
Telugu-language television shows
Indian comedy television series
2020 Indian television series debuts
Star Maa original programming